The Ururi-Rotello station is the railway station serving the municipalities of Ururi and Rotello in the province of Campobasso.

The station is closed for the passenger service.

Note

Bibliography
La strada ferrata Termoli-Campobasso(Ripalimosani : Arti grafiche La Regione, 1992) Codice identificativo bibliotecario nazionale italiano IT\ICCU\CFI\0251972 
Rete Ferroviaria Italiana. Fascicolo Linea 138

External links

History and pictures of Molise railway stations 

Prospetto cronologico dei tratti di ferrovia aperti all'esercizio dal 1839 al 31 dicembre 1926

This article is based upon a translation of the Italian language version as at May 2017.

Railway stations in Molise